Capital University Law School is an ABA-accredited private law school located in downtown Columbus, Ohio. The law school is affiliated with Capital University, the oldest university in Central Ohio and one of the oldest and largest Lutheran-affiliated universities in North America.

History
Capital University Law School transformed from the Columbus Law School, which was founded in 1903, as part of a national program sponsored by YMCA to make legal education practical, accessible, and affordable. Since its affiliation with Capital University in 1966, the law school has grown. Its faculty now stands at 83 and its Law Library holdings have increased to more than 265,000 volumes, periodicals, and microfilms.

Location
Capital University Law School is located in the heart of the Discovery District of Columbus, Ohio. The site held the city's Central High School from 1862 to 1928. The area is near the Ohio Statehouse, the Supreme Court of Ohio, and other offices giving direct access to a variety of diverse internships, externships, and other real-world legal educational opportunities.

The law school’s stately 75-year old building‘s front entrance is framed by elaborate polished brass relief artwork, commissioned by well known artist Ralph J Menconi, depicting a ship, most likely the Santa Maria, and surrounded by vintage Art-Deco era accents.  At the suggestion and assistance of law school alumnus
Michael A Massa, Dean Jack Guttenberg created a Wall of Class Portraits in the front lobby of the law school building in 2006.

Academics
Capital University Law School has been accredited by the American Bar Association since 1950 and has been a member of the Association of American Law Schools since 1983. The student-faculty ratio is 8:1. The law school has been a charter member of the League of Ohio Law Schools since 1934.

Capital's 2013 entering class was composed of 164 students. Capital Law School maintains a Juris Doctor, an LL.M. in Business, an LL.M. in Taxation, and an LL.M. in Business and Taxation. The school's J.D. program has a full-time day division, as well as a part-time day and a part-time evening division. The J.D. program has concentrations in children and family law, civil litigation, criminal litigation, dispute resolution, environmental law, governmental affairs, labor and employment law, and small business entities publicly held companies. Students in the J.D. program may also avail themselves of joint degree programs in: Master of Business Administration, Master of Science in Nursing, and Master of Theology.

Capital Law is home to The Family and Youth Law Center and the Center for Dispute Resolution. Capital University Law School also serves the legal profession and business professionals through certificate programs (paralegal, legal nurse consultant, life care planner, as well as mediation and dispute resolution) and a variety of scholarly symposia and conferences that offer continuing legal education credit. Capital also offers a general litigation clinic, a mediation clinic, a family advocacy clinic, and a small business clinic.

Rankings
In 2021, U.S. News & World Report ranked Capital's full-time Juris Doctor program between 147th and 193rd out of 193 full-time programs in the United States. That same year, U.S. News ranked Capital's part-time Juris Doctor program between 55th and 70th out of 70 part-time programs in the country.

The school was voted a "Best Value Law School" on the basis of tuition by the National Jurist magazine in 2009. In 2011, the National Jurist magazine, as well as PreLaw magazine named Capital as one of the nation’s top law schools in preparing students for legal careers in public service. In 2012, the magazines listed Capital as one of the nation’s top law schools in terms of preparing its students for the bar exam. In 2014, Capital was named to the National Jurist Magazine's "Honor Roll" of law schools that provide practical legal education. In 2015, Capital was once again listed in the National Jurist Magazine's "Honor Roll" of law schools that deliver a practical, experiential legal education. In 2019, PreLaw magazine listed Capital Law as one of the top law schools in the country for practical training and alternate dispute resolution. PreLaw magazine further listed Capital as one of the top law schools for criminal law in 2019.

Bar passage
Capital’s average Ohio bar passage rate for first time takers of exams administered from 2010 through 2014 was 87.81 percent - the third highest of Ohio's nine law schools. Capital has the highest Ohio bar passage rate among private law schools in Ohio among first-time test takers.

Post-graduation employment
Capital University's Law School Transparency employment score is 51.6%. The University's Law School Transparency under-employment score is 21.4%, indicating the percentage of the Class of 2021 unemployed, pursuing an additional degree, or working in a non-professional, short-term, or part-time job nine months after graduation. The median salary for Capital University Law School graduates is $47,553.

Costs
The total cost of attendance (indicating the cost of tuition, fees, and living expenses) at Capital University Law School for the 2022-2023 academic year is approximately $62,025 for a full-time student. The Law School Transparency estimated debt-financed cost of attendance for three years is $215,108.

People
A variety of notable Capital Law faculty and alumni have made significant contributions on the local, state and national levels.

Notable faculty
 Bradley A. Smith - former Commissioner and Chairman of the Federal Election Commission from 2000 to 2005
 Jack Guttenberg - a legal writer, an expert on professional responsibility, and a co-author of the authoritative source on the Ohio new law of professional conduct for attorneys, Ohio Law of Professional Conduct.
A survey completed in 2008 of faculty scholarship conducted by the Roger Williams University School of Law found Capital's faculty to be one of the most productive scholarly faculties in its tier for 1993-2008, Capital being the #2 law school as listed in U.S. News & World Report’s fourth tier of law schools, and #36 of law schools that were outside of the top 50 law schools in U.S. News.

Notable alumni
 Jennifer Brunner, Ohio Secretary of State (2007–2010)
 Jonathan Dever, former State of Ohio Representative
 Daniel Gaul, judge for the Cuyahoga County Common Pleas Court
 Bruce Edward Johnson, Ohio Lt. Governor (2004–2006) 
 Jim Jordan, U.S. Representative (R-OH, 2007–present)
 Greg Lashutka, Mayor, Columbus, OH (1991–1999)
 Allen Loughry, Justice of the West Virginia Supreme Court of Appeals
 Dennis M. McCarthy, Assistant Secretary of Defense for Reserve Affairs (2009-2011)
 Paul McNulty, US Deputy Attorney General (2005–2007), US Attorney for the Eastern District of Virginia (2001–2005)
 Deborah Pryce, U.S. Representative (R-OH, 1993-2009)
 Harley Rouda, US Representative (D-CA)
 Dave Yost, Ohio's 32nd Auditor of State and 51st Ohio Attorney General

References

 
Universities and colleges founded by the YMCA
Law schools in Ohio
Buildings in downtown Columbus, Ohio
Educational institutions established in 1903
1903 establishments in Ohio
Broad Street (Columbus, Ohio)